Shiloh, Arkansas may refer to:

Shiloh, Columbia County, Arkansas    
Shiloh, Howard County, Arkansas   
Shiloh, Lafayette County, Arkansas  
Shiloh, Pope County, Arkansas